Bachelor Party (aka Mystique Presents Swedish Erotica: Bachelor Party) is a pornographic video game for the Atari 2600 by American Multiple Industries in 1982.

Gameplay 
The game is a simplified version of Breakout where the "ball" is made to look like a nude man and the "bricks" are made to look like nude women and the man bounces back and forth horizontally rather than vertically.  On the left, he is repelled by a woman with whom he collides and subsequently eliminates from play, or by the opposing wall.  On the right, a paddle (said to be a container of aphrodisiac "Spanish Fly" in the manual) returns the depleted bachelor to the room full of women.  The paddle is controlled by the player using a paddle controller.

The premise is that of an unnamed bachelor having his final fling with a room full of inexplicably nude women.  The equally unclothed bachelor is propelled repeatedly into the room of women by a container of "Spanish Fly" used as the player's paddle.  When entering the fray, the bachelor's exaggerated and pixelated penis is seen to be erect.  When he returns from having collided with (and presumably had sexual intercourse with) a woman or after hitting the opposing wall, his penis sags.  It returns to erect when the bachelor is successfully set moving again toward the left.

A second version of the game, titled Bachelorette Party, also exists.  It has no difference in gameplay, but has the game sprites reversed: The player uses the paddle to bounce a naked woman toward naked men.

Reception

See also

 List of video games notable for negative reception
Beat 'Em & Eat 'Em
Custer's Revenge

References

External links
Bachelor Party at Atari Mania
Bachelor Party at AtariAge

Breakout clones
Atari 2600 games
Atari 2600-only games
Erotic Atari 2600 games
Multiplayer and single-player video games
Mystique (company) games
Video games developed in the United States